Soğuksu is a village in the Gümüşova District of Düzce Province in Turkey. Its population is 113 (2022).

References

Villages in Gümüşova District